Breathless is the 1998 Indi-pop album by Indian singer-composer Shankar Mahadevan featuring lyricist Javed Akhtar. It was the album that first made Mahadevan famous. The title track, "Breathless," is a steady stream of a song that goes on without a break, stanzas, verse or apparently even a pause for breath. The length of the part of the song which is 'breathless' is about three minutes. Mahadevan made the album in collaboration with Akhtar, a reputed lyricist in the Indian music industry. Renu Desai was a model and appeared in the music video of Shankar Mahadevan's "Breathless". The album won the award for Best Non-film Album at the 1998 Screen Awards.

Track listing

Reception
The music album was a huge success, selling over 300,000 copies and topped all major music charts in India for about 10 straight weeks.

Music video
The music video of the title song "Breathless" was directed by Farhan Akhtar and his sister Zoya Akhtar. This was the beginning of a long association, as Shankar, along with Ehsaan Noorani and Loy Mendonsa (as Shankar–Ehsaan–Loy), went on to score music for all of the films directed by Farhan and Zoya Akhtar.

In popular culture
The song appears on the 2002 Assamese film "Tumiye Mur Kalpanar".

Breathless Reprise
Both Shankar and Javed Akhtar later reunited to come out with "Breathless Reprise," a similar song whose story takes off from where "Breathless" ended.

Recreation
In 2018, Mahadevan recreated the song to highlight the programmes and initiatives of the Narendra Modi-led government.

See also
 Shankar Mahadevan
 Shankar–Ehsaan–Loy
 Farhan Akhtar
 Zoya Akhtar

References

Shankar Mahadevan albums
2004 albums